Saint-Gérard-Majella is a village and former parish municipality in the Lanaudière region of Quebec.  On 1 July 2000 it merged into L'Assomption, Quebec. Earlier, on 24 May 2000, parts of its territory had been annexed to Crabtree and to Saint-Paul.

References

Former municipalities in Quebec
Incorporated places in Lanaudière
Greater Montreal
1719 establishments in the French colonial empire
Populated places disestablished in 2000